Graciela Elena Bianchi Poli (born 14 November 1953) is a Uruguayan lawyer, notary, teacher, and politician of the National Party. She currently serves as Senator of Uruguay in the 49th Legislature. She is known for her interventions on social networks, in constant confrontation with the opposition.

Early life and education
Coming from a leftist family, her paternal and maternal grandparents emigrated to Uruguay escaping from Benito Mussolini's regime in Italy. After 35 years in teaching, she is currently retired. She worked until 2014 as a panelist on the daytime talk show Esta boca es mía broadcast on Teledoce.

Political career 
In 2013 she joined the National Party. In the 2014 primaries, she endorsed Luis Lacalle Pou for president, being elected Senator and Deputy for Montevideo. In January 2015, she announced that she would not assume her seat in the Senate, opting to take on deputies, in accordance with the provisions of Article 101 of the Constitution of the Republic.

In the 2019 general election, she was elected senator for the 49th Legislature. She assumed her seat on February 15, 2020, and since March of that year, she has been second in the presidential line of succession.

Personal life
Bianchi is married and the mother of two children, the elder a notary and the younger an architect.

References

External links
 

1954 births
20th-century Uruguayan lawyers
21st-century Uruguayan women politicians
21st-century Uruguayan politicians
Broad Front (Uruguay) politicians
Living people
Members of the Chamber of Representatives of Uruguay
National Party (Uruguay) politicians
Uruguayan educators
Uruguayan notaries
Uruguayan women educators
Uruguayan women lawyers
20th-century women lawyers
Uruguayan people of Italian descent